The Mid-Pleistocene Transition (MPT), also known as the Mid-Pleistocene Revolution (MPR), is a fundamental change in the behaviour of glacial cycles during the Quaternary glaciations. The transition happened approximately 1.25–0.7 million years ago, in the Pleistocene epoch. Before the MPT, the glacial cycles were dominated by a 41,000-year periodicity with low-amplitude, thin ice sheets and a linear relationship to the Milankovitch forcing from axial tilt. After the MPT there have been strongly asymmetric cycles with long-duration cooling of the climate and build-up of thick ice sheets, followed by a fast change from extreme glacial conditions to a warm interglacial. The cycle lengths have varied, with an average length of approximately 100,000 years.

The Mid-Pleistocene Transition was long a problem to explain, as described in the article 100,000-year problem. The MPT can now be reproduced by numerical models that assume a decreasing level of atmospheric carbon dioxide, a high sensitivity to this decrease, and gradual removal of regoliths from northern hemisphere areas subject to glacial processes during the Quaternary. The reduction in  may be related to changes in volcanic outgassing, the burial of ocean sediments, carbonate weathering or iron fertilization of oceans from glacially induced dust. 

Regoliths are believed to affect glaciation because ice with its base on regolith at the pressure melting point will slide with relative ease, which limits the thickness of the ice sheet. Before the Quaternary, northern North America and northern Eurasia are believed to have been covered by thick layers of regoliths, which have been worn away over large areas by subsequent glaciations. Later glaciations were increasingly based on core areas, with thick ice sheets strongly coupled to bare bedrock. 

However, a 2020 study concluded that ice age terminations might have been influenced by obliquity since the Mid-Pleistocene Transition, which caused stronger summers in the Northern Hemisphere.

See also 
 100,000-year problem
 Chibanian
 Milankovitch cycles
 Paleoclimatology
 Paleothermometer
 Timeline of glaciation

References

Paleoclimatology
Events that forced the climate
Glaciology
Ice ages
Pleistocene